Chista (Ciṣṭā)),  is the minor goddess most closely associated with wisdom, knowledge, and insight in Zoroastrianism. Her name is derived from the Avestan derivative of the verb Cit, ‘to notice, to understand’. The sixteenth yasht (or "hymn") of the Avesta is dedicated to Chista and she is also mentioned in the tenth yasht (Yt. 10.126).

Zarathustra's youngest daughter was named "Pouro Chista" or "Pouručistā", meaning “the one who is noticed by many people, the charming one," or a very wise and knowledgeable person.

The Iranian cultural magazine Tchissta, founded in 1981 by mathematician and activist Parviz Shahriari, was named after Chista.

Nomenclature and etymology
Though a direct etymology is unknown, the name Chista is probably derived from the feminine form of the Avestan participle čista “noticed, noticeable.” The action noun čisti “intuition, idea” appears only within the special vocabulary of the Gathas and the Yasna haptaŋhāiti.

References

Ancient Iranian gods
Names of God in Zoroastrianism
Wisdom gods
God
Iranian gods
Iranian deities
Yazatas